Bombyx huttoni, or the chocolate-tipped silk moth,  is a moth belonging to the silk moth family, Bombycidae. It is closely related to the domestic silk moth (Bombyx mori).

It was described by John O. Westwood in 1847. Westwood named the species after a Captain Thomas Hutton, FRGS of Mussoorie who forwarded the specimen to him. The type specimen was collected by Hutton in Simla in 1837 but illness of the collector and the advent of the First Anglo-Afghan War delayed its dispatch to Europe till 1842.
Bombyx huttoni is one of the moths of the superfamily Bombycoidea which have had their complete mitochondrial genome reconstructed from whole-genome Illumina sequencing data.

Description

The wings of the adult moth B. huttoni have concave margins. The forewings are grey-brown with a dark brown line across the forewing; the innermost lines near the base of the wing are double curves. The tip of the firewing has a dark chocolate-coloured patch. The hindwing is darker. Its inner margin is chequered brown and white with a broad grey border along the outer margin.

Range
It is found in Pakistan, India, Vietnam, Nepal, Bhutan and Taiwan.

It ranges in India from the Northwest Himalayas to Sikkim, Assam and Arunachal Pradesh.

Natural history

The food plant of the wild silk moth B. huttoni is recorded by Hutton as the wild indigenous mulberry tree of the Northwest Himalayas, possibly Morus indica. The moth is bivoltine, with one brood in the spring and the other in the autumn. The eggs are laid in the previous season on bark, either of the trunk, or the underside of the branches, where they are sheltered from rain, snow and dust, and also from predators. They hatch just after the time the mulberry tree comes into leaf in the spring, typically in March. The eggs are similar to those of Bombyx mori but a pale-straw yellow in colour. The caterpillar has black, brown and yellow streaks on its body. The first three segments are enlarged and it has paired-spines at the rear. 

Hutton describes the caterpillar in detail as follows:

The cocoon is whitish in colour and of a "soft loose consistence, not unlike the cocoons of some Bengal Bombyx silk worms, but is much less 
compact; it is formed between the leaves of the food plant". 

However, the caterpillars are so numerous as to denude the mulberry tree including the leaves in which cocoons have already been spun forcing the caterpillars to die of hunger or to descend the tree and spin their cocoons on nearby bushes and plants, during which they fall prey to birds. The mulberry tree sets forth shoots and leaves by end June and well in time for the autumnal brood.

Hutton reports the silk of wild B. huttoni moths to be of the best quality but not commercially viable due to uncertainties of supply in the wild. Hutton attempted to farm the moths for silk but found it impractical due to the tendency of caterpillars to wander off trays while being raised and their resultant predation. The moth also did not cross-breed with related wild silk moth species in his experiments, forcing him to conclude his enterprise.

References

Moths described in 1847
Bombycidae